People who have served as Deputy Speaker or Assistant Speaker of the New South Wales Legislative Assembly are:

References

 
1999 establishments in Australia